The 2016 TCR International Series Estoril round was the second round of the 2016 TCR International Series season. It took place on 24 April at the Autódromo do Estoril.

Gianni Morbidelli won the first race, starting from second position, driving a Honda Civic TCR, and James Nash gained the second one, driving a SEAT León TCR.

Ballast
Due to the results obtained in the previous round, Pepe Oriola received +30 kg, James Nash +20 kg and Dušan Borković +10 kg.

In addition, the Balance of Performance was reviewed for this round: Volkswagen Golf GTI TCRs received a -30 kg bonus, while Opel Astra TCRs and Alfa Romeo Giulietta TCRs were given a -20 kg bonus.

Classification

Qualifying

Notes
 — Dušan Borković was moved to the back of the grid for having not set a time within the 107% limit.

Race 1

Race 2

Notes
 — Kevin Gleason and Luca Rangoni were moved to the back of the grid because of a parc fermé infringement.

Standings after the event

Drivers' Championship standings

Model of the Year standings

Teams' Championship standings

 Note: Only the top five positions are included for both sets of drivers' standings.

References

External links
TCR International Series official website

Estoril
TCR International Series
TCR